An alien registration card may refer to:

Alien registration in Japan
Resident registration number (South Korea)
Permanent residence (United States)